Bhuvana Natarajan was an Indian translator and short story writer. She published over 20 books and in 2009 was awarded the Sahitya Akademi Translation Prize for translation from Bengali to Tamil. Many of her short stories have appeared in Kalki, Mangaiyar Malar, Saavi, Sumangali, Jnana Bhoomi, Idhayam Pesugiraday and Gokulam. She was able to read, write and converse in Tamil, Bengali, Hindi, English and had working knowledge of Sanskrit. She lived in Calcutta for over 43 years and later in Chennai.

She attended the World Tamil Conference held in Tanjavur in 1995 as an observer representing Bharathi Tamizh Sangam, Calcutta.

Awards
Nalli Thisai Ettum Virudu for best translation from Bengali to Tamil for the year 2007;
Tirupur Tamizh Sangam Award for best translation for the year 2007;
Sahitya Akademi Translation Prize – for translation from Bengali to Tamil (Mudhal Sabadham) for 2009 (original work by Ashapoorna Devi).

Works
Mudhal Sabadam or Prothom Protishruti (in Bengali), was written in Bengali by Ashapoorna Devi which was awarded the Jnanpith Award. This novel was later made into a movie.

Original works
Mother Teresa
Raja Ram Mohan Roy
Netaji Subhas Chandra Bose

Translations
Vangaala Sirukadhaigal – short stories of Ashapoorna Devi
Sondha Mannai Thedi – Taslima Nasreen
Gana Devatha – Tarashankar Bandopadhyay (Jnanpith award winner)
Devadas – Sharat Chandra Chatterji
Andhakkaalam – Sunil Gangopadhyay
Jagmohanin Maranam – Mahasweta Devi
Karuppu Sooriyan - Ashapoorna Devi
Dharmamum Adharmam - Various (short story collection)
En Thaikku En Kadaisi Namaskarangal - Santosh Kumar Ghosh
Porattam - Sunil Gangopadhyay
Vanga Mozhi Siru Kadhai Toguppu - Bibhutibhushan Bandopadhyay
Oru Oliyin Maranam - Various (short story collection)
Magizhamnu Manam - Various (short story collection)
Ganadevata - Tarashankar Bandopadhyay

References

1942 births
Living people
20th-century Indian translators
20th-century Indian biographers
Translators from Bengali
Translators to Tamil
Women writers from West Bengal
20th-century Indian women writers
20th-century Indian short story writers
Indian women non-fiction writers
Women biographers
Indian women translators
Recipients of the Sahitya Akademi Prize for Translation